Eric Black is an American journalist. He was a longtime reporter for the Minnesota Star Tribune newspaper, and has also been a Twin Cities blogger. He is currently a columnist for  online newspaper MinnPost, primarily writing about politics and the historical background of current issues.

Awards
In 2017 the national Society of Professional Journalists presented Black with a Sigma Delta Chi Award] for online column writing.

Works
Black is the author of a book entitled Parallel Realities: A Jewish-Arab History of Israel/Palestine. The book gives an overview of the two parties of the conflict, with arguments supporting why either side may be in the right, as well as criticizing them. The book also gives a summary of the historical events leading up to the modern day Israeli-Palestinian conflict.

In late 2012 Black wrote a multi-part series of columns about the U.S. Constitution entitled "Imperfect Union".

References

External links
About Eric Black from Minnpost.com

Year of birth missing (living people)
Living people
American male journalists